Kim Ho-seong (September 7, 1969 - May 18, 2021) was a South Korean voice actor who joined the Munhwa Broadcasting Corporation's voice acting division in 1996. He was cast in the Korea TV Edition of "CSI: Crime Scene Investigation" as Grec Sanders, replacing Eric Szmanda.

Roles

Broadcast TV 
CSI: Crime Scene Investigation (replacing Eric Szmanda, Korea TV Edition, MBC)
Smallville (replacing Sam Jones III, Korea TV Edition, MBC)
Fullmetal Alchemist (Korea TV Edition, AniOne)

Movie dubbing 
Ghost World (replacing Steve Buscemi, Korea TV Edition, MBC)
Bad Boys II (replacing Will Smith, Korea TV Edition, MBC)

See also 
Munhwa Broadcasting Corporation
MBC Voice Acting Division

References

External links 
MBC Voice Acting Division Kim Ho Seong Blog(in Korean)

1969 births
2021 deaths
South Korean male voice actors
20th-century South Korean male actors
21st-century South Korean male actors